Haitham Jibara (born 1964) is an Iraqi wrestler. He competed in the men's freestyle 74 kg at the 1988 Summer Olympics.

References

External links
 

1964 births
Living people
Iraqi male sport wrestlers
Olympic wrestlers of Iraq
Wrestlers at the 1988 Summer Olympics
Place of birth missing (living people)